Force K was the name given to three British Royal Navy groups of ships during the Second World War. The first Force K operated from West Africa in 1939, to intercept commerce raiders. The second Force K was formed in October 1941 at Malta, to operate against convoys sailing from Italy to Libya. Axis air attacks on Malta led to Force K being reduced and on 8 April 1942, the last ship of the force was withdrawn. After a convoy was run to Malta in Operation Stoneage (16–20 November) Force K was re-established against Axis convoys.

Force K (1939)

The Admiralty suspected that a German pocket battleship was at large and on 1 October 1939 it became certain that a raider was operating in the South Atlantic when the crew of SS Clement was landed in South America but who mistakenly named the raider as Admiral Scheer rather than the pocket battleship . On 5 October the Admiralty formed eight groups, Forces F, G, H, I, K, L, M and N to hunt the German cruisers. Searching in the South Atlantic was conducted mostly by Forces G, H and K under the command of Admiral George d'Oyly Lyon the Commander-in-Chief, South Atlantic. Force K was to track and destroy German commerce raiders in the South Atlantic, including .

Force K (1941)

On the night of  1941, in the Battle of the Duisburg Convoy, Force K sank the convoy, forcing , the supreme command of the Italian armed forces, to consider Tripoli "practically blockaded". Convoys to Tripoli were suspended, only Benghazi remaining in use. The combined force was so effective that in November 1941, the Axis supply line suffered 60 per cent losses.

On 19 December, at about the time of the First Battle of Sirte, ships from both forces ran into a minefield while pursuing an Italian convoy. Neptune was sunk and Aurora damaged. The destroyer Kandahar also struck a mine while attempting to assist Neptune and was scuttled the next day by the destroyer Jaguar. Following this and with a resurgence of the Axis aerial bombardment of Malta, the remaining surface ships were withdrawn, except for Penelope, which was too badly damaged to leave. Frequent air attacks while she remained in harbour earned Penelope the nickname "HMS Pepperpot"; the light cruiser sailed for Gibraltar on 8 April 1942, terminating the second Force K.

Force K (1942)

Operation Stoneage (16–20 November 1942), a convoy to re-victual Malta, was unloaded in record time. Stephen Roskill, the official historian of the Royal Navy, wrote in 1962 that the arrival of Stoneage ended the two-year siege of Malta. Submarines were transferred from Magic Carpet rides (supply runs) to offensive operations and at the end of November, 821 Naval Air Squadron (Fairey Albacores) transferred to Malta as did Force K; a Motor Torpedo Boat flotilla arrived soon after. Another cruiser and destroyer force began to operate from Bône in Algeria, which, from 1 December, enabled the Navy to attack Axis convoys to Tunisia from both directions. In 2003, Richard Woodman wrote that Stoneage delivered  of supplies, which advanced the deadline at which Malta would be compelled to surrender for lack of supplies to mid-December. The Eighth Army had expelled the Axis forces from Egypt and Cyrenaica, having entered Benghazi on 20 November. Allied success on land made convoy operations much safer and Operation Portcullis, the next Malta convoy, arrived safely on 5 December.

See also

 Force B
 Force H
 Force Z
 Malta Convoys

Footnotes

Bibliography

Further reading

External links
 The Destruction of Force K, Naval Historical Society of Australia

Military units and formations of the Royal Navy in World War II
Royal Navy task forces